Penicillium albidum is an anamorph fungus species of the genus of Penicillium which was isolated from volcanic soils in the south of Chile. Penicillium albidum produces the antibiotic Albidin.

See also
List of Penicillium species

References

Further reading
 

albidum
Fungi described in 1912